The Gospel of Basilides is the title given to a reputed text within the New Testament apocrypha, which is reported in the middle of the 3rd century as then circulating amongst the followers of Basilides, a leading theologian of Gnostic tendencies, who had taught in Alexandria in the second quarter of the 2nd century.   Basilides's teachings were condemned as heretical by Irenaeus of Lyons, and by Hippolytus of Rome, although they had been evaluated more positively by Clement of Alexandria. There is, however, no agreement amongst Irenaeus, Hippolytus or Clement as to Basilides's specific theological opinions; while none of the three report a gospel in the name of Basilides.

History
The first direct reference to a Gospel of Basilides is that found in Origen, who reports: 

Origen's notice is the source for references to the Gospel of Basilides in Jerome, Ambrose, Philip of Side, and the Venerable Bede. But none of these authors report any quotations from the supposed gospel, nor are they able to give an indication as to its content or character.

Much more is known about Basilides major work in twenty-four books; for which Clement of Alexandria records the title  (or 'Treatises') and provides quotations from book twenty-three, while other quotations are preserved in the works of Hegemonius. Some scholars maintain that Origen's notice of a Gospel of Basilides was referring to the  itself; and that the two titles are therefore to be identified. Otherwise, the Gospel of Basilides could denote a 2nd or 3rd century Gnostic text (whether lost or surviving under another title) with no connection to Basilides himself, other than being preserved within the sect that bore his name. Wilhelm Schneemelcher states that "In short it must be said that all conjectures concerning the Gospel of Basilides remain uncertain."

Account of the Crucifixion

Basilides is reported as having taught a docetic doctrine of Christ's passion. Although Irenaeus’s makes no mention of Basilides having written a gospel, he does record him as teaching that Christ in Jesus, as a wholly divine being, could not suffer bodily pain and did not die on the cross; but that the person crucified was, in fact, Simon of Cyrene.

Epiphanius of Salamis reports the same episode as being taught by Basilides, although he may in this be relying solely on Irenaeus. Accounts of the living Christ being seen laughing alongside, or above, the crucifixion are also found in two second/third century Gnostic texts in the Nag Hammadi Library; the Apocalypse of Peter and the Second Treatise of the Great Seth; and in the latter text, Simon of Cyrene is also identified as being one of a succession of bodily substitutes for the spiritual Christ. Winrich Löhr infers that a common mid-2nd century gospel tradition (which he nevertheless doubts as originating with Basilides himself) must underlie both the Irenaeus notice and the two Nag Hammadi texts.

Bibliography
 Cross, F. L. & Livingstone, E. A., eds. (1997). article "Basilides". The Oxford Dictionary of the Christian Church. Oxford University Press.  .
 Kelhoffer, James A. (2014). Conceptions of "Gospel" and Legitimacy in Early Christianity. Mohr Siebeck. 
 Löhr, Winrich A. (1995). Basilides und seine Schule. Mohr Siebeck. 
 Schneemelcher, Wilhelm (1991). New Testament Apocrypha; English translation by R. McL. Wilson. James Clarke.  .

References

Basilides
Apocryphal Gospels
2nd-century manuscripts
Basilides
Denial of the crucifixion of Jesus